In the Good Old Country Way is the third studio album released by British post-punk band The Nightingales. It was released in 1986 through the Vindaloo record label.

Track listing 
 "The Headache Collector" – 2:30
 "Down in the Dumps" – 4:21
 "Leave It Out" – 3:59
 "Comfort & Joy" – 6:58
 "Coincidence" – 3:55
 "I Spit In Your Gravy" – 6:43
 "Square Circle" – 1:27
 "Part Time Moral England" – 3:49
 "How To Age" – 6:27
 "No Can Do" – 3:46

In 2005, it was re-released by Caroline True Records and distributed by Shellshock. It included the following additional tracks:

<li>"It's a Cracker" – 3:52
<li>"Here We Go Now" – 3:05
<li>"Crafty Fag" (Live) – 3:30
<li>"What a Carry On" – 3:25
<li>"Carry On Carrying On" – 3:16
<li>"First My Job" – 3:24
<li>"Let's Surf" – 2:55
<li>"At The End of the Day" – 3:47
<li>"Down in the Dumps #2" – 4:16

Personnel 
 Robert Lloyd – lead vocals, mouth organ 
 Peter Byrchmore – guitar, keyboards, viola, vocals
 Howard Jenner – bass, penny whistle, vocals
 Maria Smith – violin, synthesizer, vocals
 Ron Collins – drums, percussion, vocals

Reception 
In a review of the album in the New Musical Express, David Swift described the band as "well and truly rejuvenated and mixing it with the best of the rest." James Robert described the album as "easily their most polished work".

References

External links 
Official artist website

1986 albums
The Nightingales albums